The Sumgayit FK 2021–22 season was Sumgayit's eleventh Azerbaijan Premier League season, and twelfth season in their history.

Season events
On 14 June, Sumgayit announced the signing of Yusif Nabiyev from Gabala on a one-year contract with the option of an additional year. The following day, 15 June, Sumgayit announced the permanent signing of Eltun Turabov from Sabah to a one-year contract after he'd previously played for Sumgayit on loan the previous season.

On 18 June, Tarlan Ahmadli returned to Sumgayit on a one-year contract from Gabala. On 25 June, Sumgayit announced their third signing of the summer from Gabala, with Roman Huseynov joining on a one-year contract.

On 17 September, Sumgayit announced the signing of Saeid Bagherpasand to a one-year contract, from Aluminium Arak.

On 16 December, Aykhan Abbasov left his role as Head Coach of Sumgayit. On 30 December, Alyaksey Baha was appointed as the new Head Coach of Sumgayit on a 2.5year contract.

On 6 January, Roman Huseynov and Saeid Bagherpasand where released by the club, with Vugar Beybalayev signing from Telavi the following day to a 2.5-year contract.

On 11 January, Sumgayit announced the signing of Elshan Abdullayev after he'd left Sabail.

On 15 January, Sumgayit announced the signing of Araz Abdullayev from Ethnikos Achna on a contract until the end of the season, with the option of an additional two-years.

Squad

Out on loan

Transfers

In

Loans in

Out

Released

Friendlies

Competitions

Overview

Premier League

Results summary

Results by round

Results

League table

Azerbaijan Cup

UEFA Europa Conference League

Qualifying rounds

Squad statistics

Appearances and goals

|-
|colspan="14"|Players away on loan:
|-
|colspan="14"|Players who left Sumgayit during the season:

|}

Goal scorers

Clean sheets

Disciplinary record

References

External links 
 Official Website

Sumgayit FK seasons
Sumgayit
Azerbaijani football clubs 2021–22 season